Banepa is a municipality and historical town in a valley situated at about  above sea level in central Nepal which is at about  east from Kathmandu. At the time of the 2011 Nepal census, it has a population of 55,528. The main attraction of Banepa is the temple of 
The Dhaneshwor Temple is 1km south of the town. Banepa is also known for its eight different temples of Lord Ganesh, Narayanthan (the temple of Lord Narayan), Bhimshenthan (the temple of Lord Bhimshen) and eight different ponds.

History
Some of the ancient names of Banepa were Banepur, Baniyapur, Banipur. As it had trade relationship with Tibet from ancient period, Banepa is also known as "Bhont", "Bhonta", "Bhon dey (भोंदेय्)". Banepa is the combination of two words i.e. "Bane" means 'Business' and "Pa" means 'Place'. Therefore, "Banepa" means 'Place of Business'.

It is believed that when entire Kathmandu Valley was covered with lake, there was a settlement in Banepa.

By early Lichchavi period (5th-8th century), settlements existed at Sanga (Sangagrama), Banepa (Ninaapa), Nala, Panauti, Khopasi, Palanchowk, Dumja and probably Dolakha, Lele (Lembatidrangga), Chitlang valley and even up to Gorkha. (Slusser, 1982).

Thakuri period (879 – 1200 A.D.) : Bhaktapur and Banepa was the core political area.

Malla Period (1200–1769 A.D.) : King Anandedeva Malla united the scattered villages and made modern Banepa surrounded by eight gates with a Ganesh (the elephant-headed god of good omen) at each of the gates in eight different directions in Kaligat Year 4197 (around 1153 B.S.). He also built a temple of Chandeshwori and arranged a trust fund for the goddess.

After having had the favours and directions of goddess Chandeshwori, King Anandadeva Malla founded seven villages (सात गाँउ), viz,

 Banepa near Chandeshwori Pitha
 Shreekhandapur near Dhaneshwor
 Panauti near Prayaga Tirtha of Nepal
 Nala near Nala Bhagawati
 Dhulikhel near Narayana
 Chaukot near the resident of Chaukora Rishi
 Sanga, near Nasika Pitha.

Old town

The old Newa: town is located at the central part of the city. It is surrounded by 8 ganesh temples with 8 adjacent ponds and Phalchaa (फल्चा).
The name of the Ganesh temples are:
Tukampwo (तुकम्प्वो) Ganesh at South (Temple of Tukampwo Ganesh was established first of all other Ganesh Temple by King Anandadeva Malla after forming new Kingdom of Banepa. It is also the major temple of Banepa.)
Kobha (कोभः) Ganesh at Southeast
Waku (वकु) Ganesh at East
Thachhu (थाछु) Ganesh at North
Kanthu (कांथु) Ganesh at Northeast
Kwonla (क्वोंला) Ganesh at Southwest
Talapukhu (तलाःपुखु) Ganesh at West
Jyasanani (ज्यासःननी) Ganesh at Northwest

These Ganesh temples are said to be the boundaries of old Banepa. The main temple of Banepa city was Chandeswori Temple along the Rudramati River.

Along with this, King Ananda Dev Malla also built wells and taps for providing the people of Banepa with the good source of water. But many of those ponds have been used for public uses and some 'Phalchaa' do not have any existence today.

Festivals

A lot of festivals are celebrated in Banepa as follows:
 Chandeshwori Jatra from Baisakh Purnima to next two days. 
 Kanya Pooja (worshipping of the young girls) during Gunla, Krishna Janmasthami
 Nawadurga Jatra
 Ganesh Jatra during Vijaya Dashami
 भीमसेन जात्रा Bhimsen Jatra
 Jaaludyo Jatra (जालुद्याे जात्रा) on the day of Ashwin Krishna Pratipada, the next day of Indra Jatra.
 Naradevi Shvetkali Naach (नरदेवी श्वेतकाली नाच, once in twelve years. It was re-continued after about after 38 years.
Krishna Janmasthami

Forgotten Festivals of Banepa 

Above mentioned festivals are still in practice. But there were many other besides these which had been discontinued due to various reasons. Some of those festivals are listed as follows:
 Kumari Nritya (कुमारी नृत्य) had been discontinued about 108 years ago.
 Jatras of Tukwampo Ganesh
Narayan and Bhimsen; Bokakhah Jatra(बाेकखः जात्रा) on Axaya Tritiya (अक्षयतृतीया), Karunamaya Jatra were also had been discontinued about 103 years ago. Many other festivals were also discontinued which were forgotten.

Present situation
Punyamata River, which was the major source of drinking water, irrigation and many other activities, is being polluted day by day. The bank of Punyamata River has been a place where solid wastage has been disposed. The sewage has been connected directly to the river without any treatment and in an unmanaged way has adversely affected the river water. Waste materials produced from local industry have turned the river water black. The surrounding countryside is also being polluted.

Due to the connection of Banepa with other places through roadways, about 300 buses, minibuses, cars, trucks, motorcycles altogether are helping in the transportation in a day. Along with this, the gases emitted from those vehicles have polluted the environment of Banepa.

In the boundary of three municipalities of Kavrepalanchowk District, namely; Banepa, Dhulikhel and Panauti, the country's only IT Park is being constructed. All the three cities have been declared as the 'Cyber City'.

Healthcare
Banepa has a Seventh-day Adventist hospital called Scheer Memorial Hospital, which was established in 1957. This hospital has been expanded as a medical college associated with Vanderbilt University in the US and Kathmandu University. Many students enroll in the B.Sc. Nursing programs at this hospital. Banepa is also the location of the Hospital and Rehabilitation Centre for Disabled Children and Reiyukai Eiko Masunaga Eye Hospital.

Transportation
Banepa is a major trade route to Tibet, with the Arniko Rajmarg, the only highway that connects Nepal and China (Tibet), running through this town. Furthermore, B.P. Koirala Highway also passes through Banepa. Though it is a small town, but it is well devolved and Banepa is the major economic center east of Kathmandu.

Media
To promote local culture, Banepa has two FM radio stations: Radio ABC, which is a Community Radio Station and Prime Fm. This area also has a Television Channel named as Araniko Television.

Education
Schools in Banepa include Spring Hill English Boarding School, Himalaya Secondary School, Banepa Valley School (currently known as Baylor International Academy), Vidhya Sagar Secondary School, Bagmati English Boarding School, Rambhakta Memorial School and Kshitij English Boarding School, Bal Batika Vidya Mandir Secondary School.And most famous school in Sanga, Banepa is Nepal Police School.

Gallery

References

External links

Populated places in Kavrepalanchok District
Newar
Municipalities in Bagmati Province
Nepal municipalities established in 1982